Richard Alvin Jackson Jr. (April 8, 1897 – October 3, 1939), nicknamed "Workie", was an American Negro league second baseman from 1921 to 1931.

A native of Greenville, South Carolina, Jackson made his Negro leagues debut in 1921 for the Bacharach Giants. He played for the club again the following season, then spent four seasons with the Harrisburg Giants. Jackson went on to play for the Baltimore Black Sox from 1926 to 1928, then spent two seasons with the Hilldale Club before finishing his career back with Baltimore in 1931. He died in Greenville in 1939 at age 42.

References

External links
 and Baseball-Reference Black Baseball stats and Seamheads
 Dick Jackson biography from Society for American Baseball Research (SABR)

1897 births
1939 deaths
Bacharach Giants players
Baltimore Black Sox players
Harrisburg Giants players
Hilldale Club players
Baseball second basemen
Baseball players from South Carolina
Sportspeople from Greenville, South Carolina
20th-century African-American sportspeople